The 1999–2000 NBA season  was the 30th season for the Portland Trail Blazers in the National Basketball Association. During the off-season, the Blazers acquired All-Star forward and 6-time champion Scottie Pippen from the Houston Rockets, acquired Steve Smith from the Atlanta Hawks, and signed free agent Detlef Schrempf. The Blazers got off to a fast start winning 13 of their first 15 games, then later on posted an 11-game winning streak in February, and held the league's best record with a 38–11 record at the All-Star break. The Blazers finished with the second best record in the league with a 59–23 record, which tied them for the second-highest win percentage in franchise history. Finishing second in the Pacific Division, they earned the #3 seed in the Western Conference on the basis that the 55–27 Utah Jazz won the Midwest Division title. (However, the Blazers would enjoy the homecourt advantage over Utah in their second-round playoff series). The Blazers made the playoffs for the 18th consecutive year.

Rasheed Wallace averaged 16.4 points, 7.0 rebounds and 1.3 blocks per game, and was selected for the 2000 NBA All-Star Game, while Smith finished second on the team in scoring averaging 14.9 points per game, and Pippen averaged 12.5 points, 6.3 rebounds, 5.0 assists and 1.4 steals per game, and was named to the NBA All-Defensive Second Team. In addition, Damon Stoudamire provided the team with 12.5 points and 5.2 assists per game, and Arvydas Sabonis contributed 11.8 points and 7.8 rebounds per game. Off the bench, second-year guard Bonzi Wells contributed 8.8 points per game, while Schrempf averaged 7.5 points and 4.3 rebounds per game, and Brian Grant provided with 7.3 points and 5.5 rebounds per game, but only played 63 games due to knee and foot injuries.

In the playoffs, the Blazers defeated the Minnesota Timberwolves, 3–1 in the Western Conference First Round, and the 2nd-seeded Jazz, 4–1 in the Western Conference Semi-finals for the second consecutive year. In the Western Conference Finals against the Los Angeles Lakers, the Blazers came back from a 3–1 series deficit to force Game 7. Up by 15 points with ten minutes remaining in Game 7, the Blazers suffered a 15–0 run by Los Angeles that tied the score, and the Lakers pulled out an 89–84 victory to advance to the 2000 NBA Finals, where they would go on to defeat the Indiana Pacers in six games to win their 12th NBA championship. Following the season, Grant was traded to the Miami Heat, and Jermaine O'Neal was dealt to the Indiana Pacers.

The Blazers did not win another playoff series until May 2, 2014, when Damian Lillard hit a 3-point shot with 0.9 seconds left to beat the Houston Rockets 99–98 in Game 6 of the Western Conference First Round of the 2014 playoffs. The Blazers would not return to the Western Conference Finals until 2019.

Offseason
Although the Trail Blazers did not have any picks in the 1999 NBA draft, they were active during the offseason. On draft day, the Blazers purchased the draft rights to Roberto Bergersen from the Atlanta Hawks. Bergersen would not sign with the team; instead, he signed with the Idaho Stampede of the Continental Basketball Association. On August 2, the Blazers traded Jim Jackson and Isaiah Rider to the Hawks for Ed Gray and Steve Smith. The same day, the Blazers signed veteran forward Detlef Schrempf. Smith would be the starting shooting guard on the "Jail Blazers". Schrempf would finish his career with Portland, retiring in 2001.

On October 2, the Blazers were involved in a seven-player trade with the Houston Rockets. In the trade, the Blazers traded six players—Stacey Augmon, Kelvin Cato, Ed Gray, Carlos Rogers, Brian Shaw, and Walt Williams—for Scottie Pippen. Pippen would be the Blazers' starting small forward until 2003, when he signed with the Chicago Bulls, the team which he spent the majority of his career with. On October 5, the Blazers signed Antonio Harvey, and the following day, they signed Joe Kleine. On October 12, the Rockets waived  Augmon, and the Blazers re-signed him on October 18.

Draft picks

The Blazers owned no picks in the 1999 NBA draft.

Roster

Regular season

Season standings

z – clinched division title
y – clinched division title
x – clinched playoff spot

Record vs. opponents

Game log

Regular season

|- style="background:#cfc;"
| 1 || November 2 || @ Vancouver
| 
| Steve Smith (22)
| Rasheed Wallace (7)
| Stoudamire, Anthony (8)
| General Motors Place18,218
| 1–0
|- style="background:#cfc;"
| 2 || November 3 || L.A. Clippers
| 
| Damon Stoudamire (23)
| Arvydas Sabonis (13)
| Damon Stoudamire (9)
| Rose Garden Arena20,584
| 2–0
|- style="background:#cfc;"
| 3 || November 5 || Denver
| 
| Steve Smith (22)
| Detlef Schrempf (8)
| Damon Stoudamire (7)
| Rose Garden Arena19,995
| 3–0
|- style="background:#cfc;"
| 4 || November 6 || L.A. Lakers
| 
| Scottie Pippen (19)
| Scottie Pippen (8)
| Pippen, Stoudamire (5)
| Rose Garden Arena20,584
| 4–0
|- style="background:#fcc;"
| 5 || November 9 || @ Utah
| 
| Steve Smith (26)
| Arvydas Sabonis (9)
| Scottie Pippen (5)
| Delta Center19,538
| 4–1
|- style="background:#cfc;"
| 6 || November 12 || @ Denver
| 
| Rasheed Wallace (19)
| Rasheed Wallace (11)
| Scottie Pippen (8)
| Pepsi Center17,512
| 5–1
|- style="background:#cfc;"
| 7 || November 13 || Atlanta
| 
| Damon Stoudamire (20)
| Jermaine O'Neal (10)
| Damon Stoudamire (7)
| Rose Garden Arena20,404
| 6–1
|- style="background:#cfc;"
| 8 || November 16 || @ Miami
| 
| Rasheed Wallace (22)
| Scottie Pippen (13)
| Pippen, Stoudamire (5)
| Miami Arena15,200
| 7–1
|- style="background:#cfc;"
| 9 || November 17 || @ Orlando
| 
| Rasheed Wallace (13)
| Rasheed Wallace (11)
| Damon Stoudamire (8)
| Orlando Arena13,542
| 8–1
|- style="background:#cfc;"
| 10 || November 19 || @ Philadelphia
| 
| Rasheed Wallace (21)
| Arvydas Sabonis (10)
| Scottie Pippen (9)
| First Union Center20,622
| 9–1
|- style="background:#cfc;"
| 11 || November 20 || @ Charlotte
| 
| Greg Anthony (24)
| Arvydas Sabonis (8)
| Damon Stoudamire (8)
| Charlotte Coliseum20,688
| 10–1
|- style="background:#fcc;"
| 12 || November 23 || @ Cleveland
| 
| Detlef Schrempf (22)
| Scottie Pippen (11)
| Damon Stoudamire (10)
| Gund Arena13,565
| 10–2
|- style="background:#cfc;"
| 13 || November 24 || @ Minnesota
| 
| Smith, Stoudamire (18)
| Pippen, Sabonis (10)
| Damon Stoudamire (9)
| Target Center16,219
| 11–2
|- style="background:#cfc;"
| 14 || November 26 || Houston
| 
| Scottie Pippen (19)
| Rasheed Wallace (10)
| Scottie Pippen (7)
| Rose Garden Arena20,477
| 12–2
|- style="background:#cfc;"
| 15 || November 27 || @ L.A. Clippers
| 
| Damon Stoudamire (24)
| Rasheed Wallace (12)
| Scottie Pippen (10)
| Staples Center14,552
| 13–2
|- style="background:#fcc;"
| 16 || November 29 || Indiana
| 
| Wallace, Pippen (20)
| Rasheed Wallace (11)
| Damon Stoudamire (6)
| Rose Garden Arena20,049
| 13–3

|- style="background:#cfc;"
| 17 || December 1 || Charlotte
| 
| Detlef Schrempf (18)
| Wallace, Smith, Schrempf (9)
| Greg Anthony (7)
| Rose Garden Arena19,980
| 14–3
|- style="background:#fcc;"
| 18 || December 3 || @ L.A. Lakers
| 
| Damon Stoudamire (23)
| Scottie Pippen (10)
| Damon Stoudamire (6)
| Staples Center18,997
| 14–4
|- style="background:#cfc;"
| 19 || December 5 || @ Phoenix
| 
| Rasheed Wallace (21)
| Arvydas Sabonis (10)
| Scottie Pippen (8)
| America West Arena19,023
| 15–4
|- style="background:#fcc;"
| 20 || December 7 || Miami
| 
| Greg Anthony (19)
| Rasheed Wallace (8)
| Greg Anthony (7)
| Rose Garden Arena20,317
| 15–5
|- style="background:#cfc;"
| 21 || December 9 || Minnesota
| 
| Rasheed Wallace (23)
| Brian Grant (10)
| Steve Smith (6)
| Rose Garden Arena19,980
| 16–5
|- style="background:#cfc;"
| 22 || December 11 || @ Sacramento
| 
| Pippen, Wallace (24)
| Wallace, Sabonis (11)
| Damon Stoudamire (11)
| ARCO Arena17,317
| 17–5
|- style="background:#cfc;"
| 23 || December 16 || @ Seattle
| 
| Damon Stoudamire (20)
| Wallace, B. Grant (9)
| Detlef Schrempf (7)
| KeyArena17,072
| 18–5
|- style="background:#fcc;"
| 24 || December 17 || Phoenix
| 
| Damon Stoudamire (22)
| Scottie Pippen (10)
| Scottie Pippen (6)
| Rose Garden Arena20,584
| 18–6
|- style="background:#fcc;"
| 25 || December 20 || @ Denver
| 
| Damon Stoudamire (19)
| Rasheed Wallace (10)
| Damon Stoudamire (5)
| Pepsi Center15,708
| 18–7
|- style="background:#cfc;"
| 26 || December 21 || @ Houston
| 
| Steve Smith (22)
| Pippen, B. Grant (8)
| Scottie Pippen (8)
| Compaq Center16,285
| 19–7
|- style="background:#cfc;"
| 27 || December 23 || Golden State
| 
| Rasheed Wallace (20)
| Arvydas Sabonis (7)
| Stoudamire, Schrempf (7)
| Rose Garden Arena20,440
| 20–7
|- style="background:#cfc;"
| 28 || December 28 || Seattle
| 
| Rasheed Wallace (24)
| Wallace, Sabonis (8)
| Pippen, Stoudamire (6)
| Rose Garden Arena20,584
| 21–7
|- style="background:#cfc;"
| 29 || December 30 || Philadelphia
| 
| Rasheed Wallace (23)
| Rasheed Wallace (11)
| Greg Anthony (7)
| Rose Garden Arena20,584
| 22–7

|- style="background:#cfc;"
| 30 || January 3 || @ Chicago
| 
| Damon Stoudamire (16)
| Arvydas Sabonis (8)
| Pippen, Anthony (6)
| United Center22,353
| 23–7
|- style="background:#cfc;"
| 31 || January 4 || @ Toronto
| 
| Damon Stoudamire (22)
| Arvydas Sabonis (10)
| Detlef Schrempf (8)
| Air Canada Centre19,800
| 24–7
|- style="background:#fcc;"
| 32 || January 6 || @ Minnesota
| 
| Rasheed Wallace (24)
| Brian Grant (7)
| Scottie Pippen (7)
| Target Center15,223
| 24–8
|- style="background:#cfc;"
| 33 || January 8 || Phoenix
| 
| Brian Grant (21)
| Brian Grant (11)
| Scottie Pippen (9)
| Rose Garden Arena20,584
| 25–8
|- style="background:#cfc;"
| 34 || January 10 || Dallas
| 
| Pippen, Stoudamire, Schrempf (17)
| Pippen, B. Grant (8)
| Smith, Pippen, Stoudamire (6)
| Rose Garden Arena19,980
| 26–8
|- style="background:#cfc;"
| 35 || January 12 || Cleveland
| 
| Rasheed Wallace (25)
| Wallace, Pippen (9)
| Scottie Pippen (8)
| Rose Garden Arena19,980
| 27–8
|- style="background:#cfc;"
| 36 || January 14 || @ Phoenix
| 
| Arvydas Sabonis (23)
| Arvydas Sabonis (10)
| Pippen, Stoudamire (7)
| America West Arena19,023
| 28–8
|- style="background:#fcc;"
| 37 || January 15 || @ Dallas
| 
| Scottie Pippen (22)
| Scottie Pippen (9)
| Smith, Stoudamire (4)
| Reunion Arena18,148
| 28–9
|- style="background:#fcc;"
| 38 || January 18 || @ Houston
| 
| Steve Smith (21)
| Scottie Pippen (9)
| Scottie Pippen (8)
| Compaq Center16,285
| 28–10
|- style="background:#cfc;"
| 39 || January 19 || @ San Antonio
| 
| Rasheed Wallace (22)
| Sabonis, Pippen (7)
| Stoudamire, Schrempf (7)
| Alamodome20,638
| 29–10
|- style="background:#cfc;"
| 40 || January 22 || @ L.A. Lakers
| 
| Steve Smith (27)
| Rasheed Wallace (12)
| Scottie Pippen (7)
| Staples Center18,997
| 30–10
|- style="background:#cfc;"
| 41 || January 24 || New Jersey
| 
| Arvydas Sabonis (21)
| Arvydas Sabonis (13)
| Scottie Pippen (10)
| Rose Garden Arena19,980
| 31–10
|- style="background:#cfc;"
| 42 || January 27 || Utah
| 
| Jermaine O'Neal (14)
| Brian Grant (12)
| Damon Stoudamire (7)
| Rose Garden Arena20,534
| 32–10
|- style="background:#cfc;"
| 43 || January 29 || San Antonio
| 
| Steve Smith (15)
| Arvydas Sabonis (8)
| Pippen, Anthony, (4)
| Rose Garden Arena20,584
| 33–10

|- style="background:#cfc;"
| 44 || February 1 || Chicago
| 
| Brian Grant (19)
| Rasheed Wallace (9)
| Scottie Pippen (7)
| Rose Garden Arena20,220
| 34–10
|- style="background:#fcc;"
| 45 || February 3 || @ New York
| 
| Smith, Wells (18)
| Pippen, B. Grant (9)
| Damon Stoudamire (5)
| Madison Square Garden19,763
| 34–11
|- style="background:#cfc;"
| 46 || February 4 || @ Atlanta
| 
| Steve Smith (21)
| Arvydas Sabonis (12)
| Damon Stoudamire (6)
| Philips Arena18,109
| 35–11
|- style="background:#cfc;"
| 47 || February 6 || @ Boston
| 
| Steve Smith (23)
| B. Grant, O'Neal (8)
| Damon Stoudamire (7)
| FleetCenter18,624
| 36–11
|- style="background:#cfc;"
| 48 || February 7 || @ Milwaukee
| 
| Steve Smith (24)
| Brian Grant (7)
| Stoudamire, Anthony (6)
| Bradley Center15,389
| 37–11
|- style="background:#cfc;"
| 49 || February 9 || L.A. Clippers
| 
| Arvydas Sabonis (23)
| Rasheed Wallace (13)
| Damon Stoudamire (7)
| Rose Garden Arena20,310
| 38–11
|- style="background:#cfc;"
| 50 || February 15 || @ Golden State
| 
| Arvydas Sabonis (21)
| Arvydas Sabonis (16)
| Damon Stoudamire (5)
| The Arena in Oakland11,863
| 39–11
|- style="background:#cfc;"
| 51 || February 16 || Golden State
| 
| Arvydas Sabonis (20)
| Arvydas Sabonis (11)
| Stoudamire, Sabonis, Wells (4)
| Rose Garden Arena20,178
| 40–11
|- style="background:#cfc;"
| 52 || February 18 || Washington
| 
| Arvydas Sabonis (17)
| Rasheed Wallace (11)
| Smith, Pippen (4)
| Rose Garden Arena20,467
| 41–11
|- style="background:#cfc;"
| 53 || February 20 || @ Sacramento
| 
| Rasheed Wallace (24)
| Arvydas Sabonis (14)
| Scottie Pippen (6)
| ARCO Arena17,317
| 42–11
|- style="background:#cfc;"
| 54 || February 21 || Boston
| 
| Arvydas Sabonis (19)
| Arvydas Sabonis (8)
| Scottie Pippen (8)
| Rose Garden Arena20,453
| 43–11
|- style="background:#cfc;"
| 55 || February 24 || Orlando
| 
| Damon Stoudamire (30)
| Arvydas Sabonis (8)
| Pippen, Schrempf, Anthony (5)
| Rose Garden Arena20,111
| 44–11
|- style="background:#cfc;"
| 56 || February 27 || Utah
| 
| Sabonis, Wallace (17)
| Rasheed Wallace (9)
| Damon Stoudamire (9)
| Rose Garden Arena20,584
| 45–11
|- style="background:#fcc;"
| 57 || February 29 || L.A. Lakers
| 
| Scottie Pippen (19)
| Arvydas Sabonis (11)
| Scottie Pippen (4)
| Rose Garden Arena20,584
| 45–12

|- style="background:#cfc;"
| 58 || March 3 || Vancouver
| 
| Steve Smith (19)
| Rasheed Wallace (9)
| Scottie Pippen (7)
| Rose Garden Arena20,367
| 46–12
|- style="background:#fcc;"
| 59 || March 6 || Toronto
| 
| Rasheed Wallace (27)
| Arvydas Sabonis (11)
| Greg Anthony (4)
| Rose Garden Arena20,516
| 46–13
|- style="background:#fcc;"
| 60 || March 8 || @ New Jersey
| 
| Rasheed Wallace (19)
| Jermaine O'Neal (9)
| Stoudamire, Augmon (5)
| Continental Airlines Arena16,234
| 46–14
|- style="background:#fcc;"
| 61 || March 9 || @ Indiana
| 
| Rasheed Wallace (24)
| Wallace, Sabonis (11)
| Damon Stoudamire (4)
| Conseco Fieldhouse18,345
| 46–15
|- style="background:#cfc;"
| 62 || March 11 || @ Detroit
| 
| Rasheed Wallace (24)
| Pippen, Wallace (7)
| Pippen, Smith, Schrempf (4)
| The Palace of Auburn Hills22,076
| 47–15
|- style="background:#cfc;"
| 63 || March 12 || @ Washington
| 
| Damon Stoudamire (16)
| Arvydas Sabonis (13)
| Damon Stoudamire (6)
| MCI Center20,674
| 48–15
|- style="background:#cfc;"
| 64 || March 14 || Sacramento
| 
| Arvydas Sabonis (20)
| Arvydas Sabonis (16)
| Pippen, Smith, Stoudamire (4)
| Rose Garden Arena20,499
| 49–15
|- style="background:#fcc;"
| 65 || March 16 || Minnesota
| 
| Scottie Pippen (21)
| Sabonis, O'Neal (9)
| Pippen, Stoudamire (4)
| Rose Garden Arena20,060
| 49–16
|- style="background:#cfc;"
| 66 || March 18 || @ Seattle
| 
| Rasheed Wallace (24)
| Arvydas Sabonis (11)
| Pippen, Stoudamire (6)
| KeyArena17,072
| 50–16
|- style="background:#fcc;"
| 67 || March 22 || Detroit
| 
| Wallace, Smith (20)
| Rasheed Wallace (9)
| Damon Stoudamire (7)
| Rose Garden Arena20,452
| 50–17
|- style="background:#cfc;"
| 68 || March 24 || @ Golden State
| 
| Damon Stoudamire (26)
| Jermaine O'Neal (10)
| Damon Stoudamire (8)
| The Arena in Oakland15,356
| 51–17
|- style="background:#fcc;"
| 69 || March 26 || New York
| 
| Wallace, Pippen, Stoudamire (20)
| Rasheed Wallace (10)
| Damon Stoudamire (8)
| Rose Garden Arena20,497
| 51–18
|- style="background:#fcc;"
| 70 || March 28 || San Antonio
| 
| Scottie Pippen (25)
| Pippen, Wallace (6)
| Pippen, Schrempf (5)
| Rose Garden Arena20,584
| 51–19
|- style="background:#cfc;"
| 71 || March 30 || Dallas
| 
| Rasheed Wallace (34)
| Rasheed Wallace (9)
| Scottie Pippen (8)
| Rose Garden Arena20,399
| 52–19

|- style="background:#cfc;"
| 72 || April 1 || Milwaukee
| 
| Damon Stoudamire (31)
| Detlef Schrempf (8)
| Damon Stoudamire (6)
| Rose Garden Arena20,390
| 53–19
|- style="background:#cfc;"
| 73 || April 2 || Seattle
| 
| Steve Smith (21)
| Detlef Schrempf (8)
| Damon Stoudamire (6)
| Rose Garden Arena20,417
| 54–19
|- style="background:#fcc;"
| 74 || April 5 || Houston
| 
| Steve Smith (24)
| Brian Grant (12)
| Scottie Pippen (5)
| Rose Garden Arena20,384
| 54–20
|- style="background:#fcc;"
| 75 || April 6 || @ Vancouver
| 
| Rasheed Wallace (28)
| Scottie Pippen (9)
| Damon Stoudamire (6)
| General Motors Place12,234
| 54–21
|- style="background:#cfc;"
| 76 || April 8 || Vancouver
| 
| Steve Smith (27)
| Rasheed Wallace (8)
| Scottie Pippen (6)
| Rose Garden Arena20,415
| 55–21
|- style="background:#cfc;"
| 77 || April 10 || @ Utah
| 
| Smith, B. Grant (16)
| B. Grant, Wallace (7)
| Pippen, Stoudamire (4)
| Delta Center19,911
| 56–21
|- style="background:#fcc;"
| 78 || April 11 || @ Dallas
| 
| Rasheed Wallace (13)
| Brian Grant (12)
| Smith, Pippen, Stoudamire,Augmon, Anthony, Wells (2)
| Reunion Arena14,005
| 56–22
|- style="background:#cfc;"
| 79 || April 13 || @ San Antonio
| 
| Rasheed Wallace (27)
| Rasheed Wallace (8)
| Scottie Pippen (7)
| Alamodome30,641
| 57–22
|- style="background:#cfc;"
| 80 || April 16 || Sacramento
| 
| Rasheed Wallace (18)
| Rasheed Wallace (9)
| Scottie Pippen (9)
| Rose Garden Arena20,584
| 58–22
|- style="background:#cfc;"
| 81 || April 18 || @ L.A. Clippers
| 
| Steve Smith (24)
| Wallace, Sabonis (8)
| Smith, Wallace (5)
| Staples Center18,964
| 59–22
|- style="background:#fcc;"
| 82 || April 19 || Denver
| 
| Bonzi Wells (18)
| Jermaine O'Neal (11)
| Greg Anthony (5)
| Rose Garden Arena20,403
| 59–23

Playoffs

| home_wins   = 2
| home_losses = 0
| road_wins   = 1
| road_losses = 1
}}
|- align="center" bgcolor="#ccffcc"
| 1 || April 23 || Minnesota
| W 91–88
| Scottie Pippen (28)
| Scottie Pippen (9)
| Damon Stoudamire (4)
| Rose Garden Arena19,980
| 1–0
|- align="center" bgcolor="#ccffcc"
| 2 || April 26 || Minnesota
| W 86–82
| Scottie Pippen (21)
| Pippen, Wallace (7)
| Damon Stoudamire (6)
| Rose Garden Arena20,568
| 2–0
|- align="center" bgcolor="#ffcccc"
| 3 || April 30 || @ Minnesota
| L 87–94
| Steve Smith (22)
| Brian Grant (7)
| Pippen, Stoudamire (6)
| Target Center19,006
| 2–1
|- align="center" bgcolor="#ccffcc"
| 4 || May 2 || @ Minnesota
| W 85–77
| Sabonis, Wallace (15)
| Arvydas Sabonis (11)
| Scottie Pippen (6)
| Target Center19,006
| 3–1
|-

| home_wins   = 3
| home_losses = 0
| road_wins   = 1
| road_losses = 1
}}
|- align="center" bgcolor="#ccffcc"
| 1 || May 7 || Utah
| W 94–75
| Scottie Pippen (20)
| Arvydas Sabonis (14)
| Arvydas Sabonis (4)
| Rose Garden Arena20,351
| 1–0
|- align="center" bgcolor="#ccffcc"
| 2 || May 9 || Utah
| W 103–85
| Steve Smith (19)
| Grant, Wallace (8)
| three players tied (4)
| Rose Garden Arena20,463
| 2–0
|- align="center" bgcolor="#ccffcc"
| 3 || May 11 || @ Utah
| W 103–84
| Arvydas Sabonis (22)
| Arvydas Sabonis (8)
| Scottie Pippen (7)
| Delta Center19,911
| 3–0
|- align="center" bgcolor="#ffcccc"
| 4 || May 14 || @ Utah
| L 85–88
| Brian Grant (20)
| Brian Grant (13)
| Pippen, Stoudamire (4)
| Delta Center19,627
| 3–1
|- align="center" bgcolor="#ccffcc"
| 5 || May 16 || Utah
| W 81–79
| Scottie Pippen (23)
| Pippen, Sabonis (9)
| Scottie Pippen (8)
| Rose Garden Arena20,043
| 4–1

| home_wins   = 1
| home_losses = 2
| road_wins   = 2
| road_losses = 2
}}
|- align="center" bgcolor="#ffcccc"
| 1 || May 20 || @ L.A. Lakers
| L 94–109
| Scottie Pippen (19)
| Scottie Pippen (11)
| Scottie Pippen (5)
| Staples Center18,997
| 0–1
|- align="center" bgcolor="#ccffcc"
| 2 || May 22 || @ L.A. Lakers
| W 106–77
| Rasheed Wallace (29)
| Rasheed Wallace (12)
| Greg Anthony (4)
| Staples Center18,997
| 1–1
|- align="center" bgcolor="#ffcccc"
| 3 || May 26 || L.A. Lakers
| L 91–93
| Stoudamire, Wallace (19)
| Scottie Pippen (9)
| Scottie Pippen (6)
| Rose Garden Arena20,135
| 1–2
|- align="center" bgcolor="#ffcccc"
| 4 || May 28 || L.A. Lakers
| L 91–103
| Rasheed Wallace (34)
| Rasheed Wallace (13)
| Damon Stoudamire (5)
| Rose Garden Arena20,209
| 1–3
|- align="center" bgcolor="#ccffcc"
| 5 || May 30 || @ L.A. Lakers
| W 96–88
| Pippen, Wallace (22)
| Rasheed Wallace (10)
| Detlef Schrempf (6)
| Staples Center18,997
| 2–3
|- align="center" bgcolor="#ccffcc"
| 6 || June 2 || L.A. Lakers
| W 103–93
| Rasheed Wallace (30)
| Arvydas Sabonis (11)
| Arvydas Sabonis (6)
| Rose Garden Arena20,340
| 3–3
|- align="center" bgcolor="#ffcccc"
| 7 || June 4 || @ L.A. Lakers
| L 84–89
| Rasheed Wallace (30)
| Scottie Pippen (10)
| three players tied (3)
| Staples Center18,997
| 3–4

Player statistics

NOTE: Please write the players statistics in alphabetical order by last name.

Season

Playoffs

Awards and honors
 Rasheed Wallace, NBA All-Star
 Scottie Pippen, NBA All-Defensive Second Team

Transactions

References

Portland Trail Blazers seasons
Portland
Portland Trail Blazers 1999
Portland Trail Blazers 1999
Port
Port